A Moment in Time may refer to:

 A Moment in Time (album), an album by Lorrie Morgan
 A Moment in Time (novel), a 1964 novel by H. E. Bates
 A Moment in Time (film), a 2013 Filipino romantic drama film

See also 
 One Moment in Time (disambiguation)